Dylan Mandlsohn is a stand-up comedian, impressionist, and actor from Toronto, Ontario. He is known for appearances on TV series including 12 Monkeys and Nikita, and released a 2019 album produced by Grammy winner Dan Schlissel for his label Stand Up! Records, A Date With the Devil.

Early life 
Mandlsohn was raised in Toronto, and was fascinated by comedy at an early age, inspired by Jim Carrey, Dana Carvey, and Rich Little. He studied drama at the University of Windsor.

Career
Mandlsohn began performing in clubs at 17, and began touring the U.S. and Canada during college. He was a substitute teacher before being able to move into stand-up full-time. He is known for his family-friendly comedy that, in the words of one reviewer, "reins it in before it becomes too naughty."  He was a member of Los Angeles improv troupe the Groundlings. He had his own half-hour special in 2007 on the Canadian series Comedy Now!.

He was a guest on two episodes of Canadian radio comedy show The Debaters. Mandlsohn has also had acting roles in several television series, including a CIA staffer in a 2010 episode of Nikita, a guard in a 2016 episode of 12 Monkeys, and a landlord in Leslie Nielsen's final film, 2010's Stonerville.

He has also played semi-professional trampoline dodgeball.

Discography
A Date With the Devil (Stand Up! Records, 2019)

References

External links

Dylan Mandlsohn at Stand Up! Records website

21st-century Canadian comedians
Canadian stand-up comedians
Comedians from Toronto
University of Windsor alumni
Living people
Stand Up! Records artists
American impressionists (entertainers)
1980 births